Bheemgarh dam or Bhimgarh, officially the Upper Wainganga (Sanjay Sarovar) Dam, is built across the Wainganga river in Chhapara tehsil of Seoni district of Indian state of Madhya Pradesh.

The structure is 3,871 m long.

The Bhimgarh Sanjay Sarovar Dam is located 43 km away from the Seoni. It is bounded by mountains from all sides.

In recent years, the reservoir has failed to fill.

References

External References 
 
 
 

Dams in Madhya Pradesh
Seoni district
Dams completed in 1974
1974 establishments in Madhya Pradesh
20th-century architecture in India